Mirów Castle is a 14th-century castle, now ruined, located in the Mirów village, Silesian Voivodeship, Poland. It changed owners multiple times, and was finally abandoned in 1787.

See also
Castles in Poland

Castles in Silesian Voivodeship
Myszków County